Graham Reginald Rogers (born 5 September 1955) is a Welsh former professional footballer and manager.

A defender, he began his career at Newport County and made four Football League appearances in the 1974–75 season before joining Forest Green Rovers. He rejoined Newport in 1985, making a further seven appearances before joining Stroud.

In 1993, he was appointed manager of Newport County and he retained the position until 1996.

References

1955 births
Living people
Footballers from Newport, Wales
Welsh footballers
Association football defenders
Newport County A.F.C. players
Forest Green Rovers F.C. players
English Football League players
Welsh football managers
Newport County A.F.C. managers